The 2012 European Archery Championships is  the 20th edition of the European Archery Championships. The event was held in Amsterdam, Netherlands from 21 to 26 May, 2012.

Medal table

Medal summary

Recurve

Compound

References

External links
 Results Book

European Archery Championships
2012 in archery
International archery competitions hosted by the Netherlands
2012 in European sport